Mirja Salminen (born Jämes, 13 October 1924 – 20 July 2020) was a Finnish hurdler who competed in the 1948 Summer Olympics.

References

1924 births
2020 deaths
Finnish female hurdlers
Olympic athletes of Finland
Athletes (track and field) at the 1948 Summer Olympics